Synemon phaeoptila is a moth in the Castniidae family. It is found in Australia, including the Northern Territory and Queensland.

References

Moths described in 1906
Castniidae